Zeuxo (minor planet designation: 438 Zeuxo) is a large Main belt asteroid.

It was discovered by Auguste Charlois on 8 November 1898 in Nice.

References

External links
 
 

Background asteroids
Zeuxo
Zeuxo
F:-type asteroids (Tholen)
18981108